Umma Party is the name for some political parties in Africa, and may refer to:

 Umma Party (Egypt)
 Umma Party (Sudan)
 Umma Party (Zanzibar)
 Umma Islamic Party, in Saudi Arabia

See also 
 Umma (disambiguation)